John de Winchcombe was a priest in the Roman Catholic Church.

Career
De Winchcombe is shown as rector of St. Lawrence Church in Ayot St Lawrence, Hertfordshire, England, although the exact date is unknown.

He was presented the post of vicar of St. Mary the Virgin, Aylesbury in December 1312 by Robert de Baldock, Prebendary of Aylesbury.

Sometime after 1333 he appears as precentor at St. Paul's Cathedral, London.

References
  The historical antiquities of Hertfordshire By Henry Chauncy]
 
 A popular account of St. Paul's cathedral

Year of birth unknown
Year of death missing
14th-century English Roman Catholic priests
People from Ayot St Lawrence
People from Aylesbury